Storskog is a border crossing station on the Norwegian side of the Norway-Russia border, along the European route E105 highway. The crossing is located in Sør-Varanger Municipality in Finnmark county on the Norway side of the border.

The Russian side is in Boris Gleb in Pechengsky District in Murmansk Oblast. There is a border crossing station on the Russian side also, and both have to be passed to enter the opposite country. There is a duty-free shop in Russia between the stations.

Storskog is the only legal land border crossing between Norway and Russia.

In 2013, 320,000 (in 2010, 141,000) crossings were made across the border at the Storskog border station.

See also 
 Nazi concentration camps in Norway
 Norway–Russia border
 Norway–Russia border barrier

References

External links

Norway–Russia border crossings
Pechengsky District
Sør-Varanger